Ecological release refers to a population increase or population explosion that occurs when a species is freed from limiting factors in its environment. Sometimes this may occur when a plant or animal species is introduced, for example, to an island or to a new territory or environment other than its native habitat. When this happens, the new arrivals may find themselves suddenly free from the competitors, diseases, or predatory species, etc. in their previous environment, allowing their population numbers to increase beyond their previous limitations. Another common example of ecological release can occur if a disease or a competitor or a keystone species, such as a top predator, is removed from a community or ecosystem. Classical examples of this latter dynamics include population explosions of sea urchins in California's offshore kelp beds, for example, when human hunters began to kill too many sea otters, and/or sudden population explosions of jackrabbits if hunters or ranchers kill too many coyotes.

The foreign species either flourishes into a local population or dies out. Not all released species will become invasive; most released species that don't immediately die out tend to find a small niche in the local ecosystem.
Ecological release also occurs when a species expands its niche within its own habitat or into a new habitat.

Origin
The term ecological release first appeared in the scientific literature in 1972 in the American Zoologist journal discussing the effects of the introduction of a sea snail on an isolated ecosystem, Easter Island. One of the first studies that linked niche shifts to the presence and absence of competitors was by Lack and Southern where habitat broadness of song birds was positively correlated to the absence of a related species.

Common example
Invasive species are an excellent example of successful ecological release because low levels of biodiversity, an abundance of resources, and particular life history traits allow their numbers to increase dramatically. Additionally, there are few predators for these species.

Causes and mechanisms

Cascade effect
When a keystone species, such as a top predator, is removed from a community or ecosystem, a cascade effect can occur through which a series of secondary extinctions take place. Keystone predators are responsible for the control of prey densities, and their removal can result in an increase in one or a number of predators, consumers, or competitors elsewhere in the food web. Several prey or competitor species can consequently suffer a population decline and potentially be extirpated; the result of this would be a decrease in community diversity. Without the keystone species, prey populations can grow indefinitely and will, ultimately, be limited by resources such as food and shelter. Due to these secondary extinctions, a niche is left unfilled: this allows a new species to invade and exploit the resources that are no longer being used by other species.

Human causes ecological release

Ecological release by human means, intentional or unintentional, has had drastic effects on ecosystems worldwide. The most extreme examples of invasive species include: cane toads in Australia, kudzu in the Southeast United States, or beavers in Tierra Del Fuego. But ecological release can also be more subtle, less drastic and easily overlooked such as mustangs and dandelions in North America, musk oxen in Svalbard, dromedaries in Australia, or peaches in Georgia

References

Biogeography
Behavioral ecology